Karan Patel (born 30 September 1994) is an Indian cricketer. He made his first-class debut for Gujarat in the 2016–17 Ranji Trophy on 20 October 2016. He made his Twenty20 debut for Gujarat in the 2016–17 Inter State Twenty-20 Tournament on 29 January 2017.

References

External links
 

1994 births
Living people
Indian cricketers
Gujarat cricketers
Place of birth missing (living people)